Hilarion the Iberian (c. 822-875) was a Georgian monk from the Kakheti region, bishop of David Gareja. He was considered as the thaumaturgus and is venerated as a saint. His vita was composed after his death on Mount Athos by the followers of Euthymius of Athos. The extant texts are from 10th and 11th centuries. Per the vita, Hilarion visited the Holy Land and traveled with his followers through Palestine and Syria. He visited Mount Tabor, the Jordan River and the Lavra of Saint Sabas. Hilarion would stay there for seven years living in the cave leading monastic hermitage. Later, in 864, he founded a monastery on Mount Olympus, possibly identified as "Lavra of Krania", which was housing largely his Georgian compatriots. The church at various times sheltered John the Iberian, Euthymius of Athos and Tornike Eristavi. Hilarion died in Thessaloniki.

References

Bibliography 
Tchekhanovets, Y. (2018) The Caucasian Archaeology of the Holy Land: Armenian, Georgian and Albanian communities between the fourth and eleventh centuries CE, Brill Publishers 
Morris, R. (2002) Monks and Laymen in Byzantium, 843-1118, Cambridge University Press 
Louth, A. (2007) Greek East and Latin West: The Church, AD 681-1071, St Vladimir's Seminary Press

875 deaths 
Nobility of Georgia (country) 
Saints of Georgia (country) 
9th-century people from Georgia (country) 
Religious leaders from Georgia (country)
Miracle workers 
Byzantine people of Georgian descent